Tip of the Sphere is the ninth studio album by American singer-songwriter Cass McCombs. It was released on February 8, 2019 through Anti- Records. 

"Sleeping Volcanoes" was released as the first single from the album on October 30, 2018.

Track listing

Charts

References

2019 albums
Cass McCombs albums
Anti- (record label) albums